Rubidium sesquioxide is a chemical compound with the formula  or . It has been studied theoretically as an example of a strongly correlated material.

The compound was predicted to be a rare example of a ferromagnetic compound that is magnetic due to a p-block element, and a half-metal that was conducting in the minority spin band. However, while the material does have exotic magnetic behavior, experimental results instead showed an electrically insulating magnetically frustrated system.  also displays a Verwey transition where charge ordering appears at 290 K.

Rubidium sesquioxide can be prepared by reacting the peroxide  and the superoxide :

It is initially discovered in 1907, and more thoroughly characterized in 1939.

See also
Rubidium oxide

References

Rubidium compounds
Sesquioxides